Ancistrodon nepa (a taxonomic synonym) may refer to:

 Hypnale nepa, a.k.a. Sri Lankan hump-nosed viper, venomous pitviper found in Sri Lanka
 Hypnale walli, a.k.a. Wall's hump-nosed viper, venomous pitviper found in Sri Lanka